Goomburra is a rural town and locality in the Southern Downs Region, Queensland, Australia.

Inverramsay is a neighbourhood in Goomburra.

Geography 
Goomburra is on the Darling Downs. It is the valley of Dalrymple Creek which flows from east to west away from the Great Dividing Range towards Allora. The creek eventually becomes a tributary of the Condamine River, part of the Murray-Darling river system.

Goomburra railway station is an abandoned railway station on the closed Goomburra railway line.

History 
The town's name came from the name of a pastoral run operated by pastoralist Patrick Leslie from 1840 to 1841. It is an Aboriginal word which is either a corruption of gooneburra meaning fire black tribe, or which means a shield derived from the kurrajong tree.

Goomburra State School opened on 25 April 1881. It closed temporarily in 1905 due to low student numbers. It closed permanently on 14 June 1925.

This land was divided for closer settlement and sold in April 1902.

Goomburra Township Provisional School opened on 10 March 1904. On 1 January 1909 it became Goomburra Township State School. Following a fire which destroyed the school, it was closed on 3 January 1972.

St John's Anglican Church was dedicated in 1911 by The Venerable Arthur Richard Rivers. Its closure circa 2012 was approved by Archbishop Phillip Aspinall.

Goomburra was the terminus of the Goomburra railway line which opened in 1912 and closed in 1961.

The relocation of the church required two traction engines and took ten days to negotiate difficult terrain and other problems.

Inverramsay State School opened on 2 February 1914 and closed on 22 August 1965.

On 31 December 1919 in the public hall, Littleton Groom (the member for Darling Downs) unveiled the town's honour board, listing the 32 names of those who had performed military service in World War I including 10 who died in the war.

References

External links 

 

Towns in Queensland
Southern Downs Region
Localities in Queensland